Hypermaepha sanguinea is a moth of the subfamily Arctiinae. It was described by Arthur Gardiner Butler in 1878. It is found in the Amazon region.

References

Lithosiini
Moths described in 1878